The John and Amelia McClintock House is a historic building located at 321 E. Main Street in Grafton, Illinois. Boat builder John McClintock built the house for his family circa 1910. The rock-faced concrete house, an unusual departure from Grafton's limestone buildings, has a Queen Anne design. The entrance is located at the corner of a wraparound front porch and is topped by a conical roof. The front of the house has a cutaway bay, giving the house an asymmetrical appearance, and the gable roof has multiple components; both features are typical of Queen Anne designs. The building is now used as a commercial property.

The house was added to the National Register of Historic Places on February 16, 1994.

References

Houses on the National Register of Historic Places in Illinois
Queen Anne architecture in Illinois
Houses completed in 1910
Houses in Jersey County, Illinois
National Register of Historic Places in Jersey County, Illinois